Taskriout is a commune of  Kabylia in Algeria, located in the southeast of the province of Bejaia, crossed by the highway 09, leading to Aït Smail, Kherrata, upwards Sétif. It consists of five villages; Aït Idriss, where Kefrida waterfall is situated, Aït Ali Oumhend, Aït Mbarek, Arrechah and Rif. Bordj Mira is the chief town. Taskriout appertain to the district of Darguina.

Communes of Béjaïa Province
Cities in Algeria
Algeria